Central Pinklao (previously known as CentralPlaza Pinklao) is a shopping mall on Borommaratchachonnani Road in Bangkok Noi District, Bangkok, Thailand.

Overview
The shopping mall has a total of six floors with a basement floor included.

Anchors 
 Central Department Store
 Tops
 Major Cineplex 11 Cinemas (Old EGV Pinklao)
 SB Design Square
 B2S Think Space
 Officemate
 Supersports
 Power Buy
 Food Patio
 Food Park
 Familymart

See also
 List of shopping malls in Thailand

Notes

References 
 

Shopping malls in Bangkok
Central Pattana
Bangkok Noi district
Shopping malls established in 1995
1995 establishments in Thailand